Thekiso in the Sotho–Tswana languages, is the name of clan or family.

Translation
A literal meaning of "Leboko" is the plural of Maboko which literally translates to praise (poetry), from the verb "bokang" meaning praise (verb).  There is a strong and tight relationship between Seboko/Sereto (clan name) and the associated praise poem.  The two are not distinguishable from each other in their usage and one would rely on context to tell the one apart from the other.  As an example: If a person queries someone's Seboko (clan name), the answer might be recital of their praise poem or a simple one direct answer.

Description
In the Southern African Sotho–Tswana languages (Sesotho, Setswana, and the Northern Sotho language) and the traditions of the clan speakers, different groups identify themselves with certain clans. The groups believe in the existence of "Modimo oa Khale" (God of the Old) or the "Invisible One." As legend has it, they came out of a marsh called "Ntsoanatsatsi" (the place from where the sun emerges) and each clan was assigned a totem where each totem is symbolized by a 'dignified' animal.

Explanation
The selection and assignment of these animals is based on either one of two things or both: the wildness of these animals and how dignified they seem to the group. This was done to symbolize the "Invisible One". It is because of this that these totems are sacred.

In the meditation of the spirits of the deceased are also believed to give guidance and direction in the groups' under takings and dangers. Unity in this group of people still exists, although the practicing of rituals is not as strict as it used to be. The practicing of different rituals is specific to a clan: all rituals - from marriages, to circumcision, to births and burials. This also happens to be one of the ways in which the clan names are preserved. Another is the naming of children after their predecessors as a way to make sure that the names of each clan are commemorated and kept within each family in each group, in effect keeping the clan intact. The Sesotho name for this is "theellano," naming a child after their grandparents or great-grandparents.

A further important way of keeping the clans intact was reciting the clan's Seboko (singular form of Liboko). Ralets'abisa Motale, from the village Likhelekeng, in Butha-Buthe, Lesotho, who has studied the Basotho culture, argued recitation of the Seboko (clan Name) means an identification of a person, a self-explanation according to the one's family from which one descends.

This identification also assist in preventing incest where a couple would be able to realize which clan they belonged to even when being introduced as strangers without any other knowledge of each other before partaking in any sexual activities.

Switching from one Seboko to the other is not an easy task. It only occurred in extreme cases where, for example, a person had to change his identity because he had to flee into another family in a different clan. Another example is when a woman  married. An offering had to be made to the Badimo(the spirits of the deceased) and then an acceptance by the Badimo would be given to the one who is switching families.

The reason there are so many clan names is because of the splitting up of groups. Some people wanted independence, and some violated the law so they were forced out. [1]

Cultural Significance
Thorough knowledge and ability to recite ones praise poem is regarded as respect worthy.  With globalisation and urbanisation knowledge and ability to recite ones Seboko has been reduced in general.  Impact from other cultures has also contributed negatively as the practice does not have much purpose in the westernized world.  A person would be regarded as ignorant of their identity and might be looked down upon should they not be able to confidently recite their praise poem.

As the name implies when one recites the praise poem they are praising their clan and in the same vein praising themselves.  This demonstrates great confidence and self-respect of the reciter.  In some situations this demonstration of self-confidence might be taken as intimidation to an opponent.

Clan names from totems
Bakgatla – Kgabo (Vervet monkey)
 Bakoena – Koena (crocodile)
 Bafokeng – Phoka (dew), morara (wild vine), 'mutla (hare) rabbit
 Batloung – Tlou (elephant)
 Bats'oeneng – Ts'oene (baboon)
 Bakubung – Kubu (hippopotamus)
 Baphuthi – Phuthi (springbok), lejwe (stone)
 Bafula-kolobeng – Kolobe (wild pig)
 Bahlaping – Tlhapi (fish)
 Banareng – Nare (buffalo)
 Bataung- Tau (lion)
 Bahlakwana- (crocodile)
 Batlokwa- tlokwa (leopard)
 Barolong - Tholo
 Basia- Katse (cat)
 Baphiri - Phiri (hyena)
 Makholokoe - Khoho (Chicken), Phuthi
 Maphuthing - unknown so far
Bakhidi 
Batlhako - Tlou (Elephant )
SETJIE-ditjie(grass hoppers)tjie
 Baphogole - Tlou (Elephant)

References

 Batho Portal, South African Cultures

External links
 Study South Africa

Southern Africa